Conrad Nelson (born 1963) is a British actor, composer and musical director, and was Artistic Director of the Northern Broadsides company until 2019.

His acting roles have included Iago in the Northern Broadsides production of Othello when Lenny Henry played the lead, and Leontes in the company's 2015 The Winter's Tale which he also directed.

In 2013, he appeared as Sir John Middleton in Helen Edmundson's BBC Radio 4 adaptation of Sense and Sensibility.

Personal life
Nelson is married to playwright and actor Deborah McAndrew.  They have a daughter named Elizabeth

References

External links

Kevin De Ornellas. "Review of Hamlet, presented by Northern Broadsides at the Arts Centre, University of Aberystwyth Arts Centre, Aberystwyth. 9 April 2011." EMLS 15.3 (2011): 13. http://purl.org/emls/15-3/revham.htm

Living people
British male composers
British male stage actors
British theatre directors
1963 births